Peter James Petherick (25 September 1942 – 7 June 2015) was a New Zealand cricketer who represented New Zealand in six Test cricket matches between October 1976 and March 1977 as an off-spinner. He is one of two New Zealand bowlers to achieve a hat-trick in Test matches. He is one of only three players, along with Maurice Allom and Damien Fleming, to have taken a hat-trick on Test debut.

Domestic career
Making his first-class debut at 33, he played for Otago from 1975–76 to 1977–78, and for Wellington from 1978–79 to 1980–81. In his fifth match he took 9 for 93 in the first innings against Northern Districts, and he finished the 1975–76 season with 42 wickets at 20.13.

After cricket
After his retirement from cricket, Petherick took up lawn bowls, and skippered a two-man team to the final of the New Zealand national bowls championship in 2006. He died in Perth, Australia, on 7 June 2015.

See also
 List of Test cricket hat-tricks

References

External links
 
 "Greatest moments in Otago sport, number 54: Petherick bamboozles the Pakistanis" Otago Daily Times, 12 September 2011.

1942 births
2015 deaths
New Zealand Test cricketers
New Zealand cricketers
Test cricket hat-trick takers
Otago cricketers
Wellington cricketers
People from Ranfurly, New Zealand